Charles III of Savoy (10 October 1486 – 17 August 1553), often called Charles the Good, was Duke of Savoy from 1504 to 1553, although most of his lands were ruled by the French between 1536 and his death.

Biography 
He was a younger son of Philip (Filippo) the Landless, an aged younger son of the ducal family, and his second wife Claudine de Brosse of the family that unsuccessfully claimed the Duchy of Brittany. His grandparents were Duke Louis of Savoy and Anne of Cyprus. As a child, there were next to no expectations for him to succeed to any monarchy. He was christened as a namesake of the then-reigning Duke, Charles I of Savoy, the Warrior, his first cousin.

However, when he was ten years old, his father unexpectedly succeeded his grandnephew Charles II of Savoy as duke and head of the Savoy dynasty, which had now also received the titles of the kingdoms of Cyprus, Jerusalem and Armenia. However, Charles's father was not the heir general of the deceased duke, only the male heir. Jerusalem, Cyprus and certain other claims and possessions could go to a different heir, and they did, in principle, going to Charles II's sister Yolande Louise. Charles's father was not ready to relinquish those, and he took such titles to his own titulary, staking a claim. He also had Yolande marry his son, Philibert the Handsome, in 1496, to ensure the male line of succession.

In 1497, Charles's half-brother Philibert succeeded their father as Duke of Savoy, etc. Philibert however died childless in 1504, surprisingly, and now Charles succeeded, at age eighteen.

Charles faced down challenges to his authority, including from Philibert Berthelier.

After Yolande's death in 1499, the de jure rights of Jerusalem and Cyprus were lost to the Savoy family. Charles however, as some sort of heir-male, took those titles, which his successors also used. In 1713, Charles's great-great-great-grandson Victor Amadeus II of Savoy received confirmation to that title from the Kings of Spain and France, who also claimed it. The rights, according to succession of heirs general, i.e. not excluding female lines, had gone, until Charles's death, to the House of La Trémoille, the French lords of La Tremoille, Princes of Talmond and Taranto.

In response to the riots between Catholic and Protestants within Geneva, Charles launched a surprise attack in July 1534, but his army was beaten back. A second siege in October 1535 was attempted, and again Charles's army was defeated when forces from Berne arrived to assist Geneva. Charles was allied with the Habsburg camp in Western European politics, where Francis I of France and Emperor Charles V battled for ascendancy.  France invaded Savoy in 1536, and held almost all of Charles's possessions. He spent the rest of his life practically in exile, at the mercy of relatives. He died in 1553 and was succeeded by his only surviving child, Emanuele Filiberto.

He was the duke who imprisoned François Bonivard, the "prisoner of Chillon" in 1530.

Issue 

Charles married the rich, beautiful and ambitious Infanta Beatrice of Portugal (1504–1538), daughter of the richest monarch in Europe at the time, Manuel I of Portugal, and Maria of Aragon. Beatrice was both first cousin and sister-in-law of Emperor Charles V. They had nine children, but only one child, Emmanuel Philibert, would reach adulthood:

 Adriano Giordano Amadeo, Prince of Piedmont (19 November 1522 – 10 January 1523)
 Ludovico, Prince of Piedmont (4 December 1523 – 25 November 1536)
 Emmanuel Philibert, Duke of Savoy (8 July 1528 – 30 August 1580), married Marguerite, Duchess of Berry, sister of Henri II, King of France
 Caterina (25 November 1529 – May 1536)
 Maria (12 June 1530 – 1531)
 Isabella (May 1532 – 24 September 1533)
 Emanuele (May 1533; died young)
 Emanuele (May 1534; died young)
 Gianmaria (3 December 1537 – 8 January 1538)

Ancestors

References

1486 births
1553 deaths
16th-century Dukes of Savoy
Italian people of Cypriot descent
Princes of Savoy
Counts of Geneva
Claimant Kings of Jerusalem
Burials at Vercelli Cathedral